was a Japanese daimyō of the early Edo period. His childhood name was Rokumaru (六丸).

Family
 Father: Hosokawa Tadatoshi
 Mother: Chiyohime (1597–1649)
 Wife: Shojōin, daughter of Karasuma Mitsukata
 Concubines:
 Seitai-in
 Shimizu-dono
 Children:
 Hosokawa Tsunatoshi (1643–1714) by Seitai-in
 Hosokawa Toshishige (1647–1687) by Seitai-in

Biography
Mitsunao was born in 1619, and was the eldest son of Hosokawa Tadatoshi. In 1637, he joined his father in the effort to subdue the Shimabara Rebellion, and fought with distinction. Succeeding his father in 1641, he became daimyō of the Kumamoto Domain.

Mitsunao's suppression of the Abe family's revolt in 1642 is famous, due to its fictionalization by Mori Ōgai.

Ancestry

References
 List of Kumamoto lords on "Edo 300 HTML"   (8 October 2007)

Daimyo
1619 births
1650 deaths
Higo-Hosokawa clan